Shaham or Shacham is a Hebrew surname. Notable people with the surname include:
Assaf Shaham, Israeli artist
Chaim Shacham, Israeli diplomat
Gil Shaham, Israeli-born American violinist
Hagai Shaham, Israeli-born American violinist
Hovav Shacham, "S" in BLS digital signature
Nathan Shaham, Israeli writer
Orli Shaham, Israeli-born American pianist
Rinat Shaham, Israeli-born singer

See also

Hebrew-language surnames